The grey-backed storm petrel (Garrodia nereis) is a species of seabird in the austral storm petrel family Oceanitidae. It is monotypic within the genus Garrodia. It is found in Antarctica, Argentina, Australia, Chile, Falkland Islands, French Southern Territories, New Zealand, Saint Helena, South Africa, and South Georgia and the South Sandwich Islands.  Its natural habitat is open seas.

The genus Garrodia was created by William Alexander Forbes in 1881 and named after English zoologist Alfred Henry Garrod, while the specific descriptor is an allusion to the Nereids, the sea nymphs of Greek mythology.

References

Cited texts
 

grey-backed storm petrel
Birds of islands of the Atlantic Ocean
Birds of subantarctic islands
Birds of the Indian Ocean
Fauna of the Prince Edward Islands
Fauna of the Crozet Islands
grey-backed storm petrel
Taxonomy articles created by Polbot
Birds of Southern Africa